Zeven jongens en een oude schuit  is a 1942 Dutch adventure film directed by G. Gerritsen, based on the eponymous novel by A.C.C. de Vletter.

Cast
Frans Beukenkamp	... 	Toon
L. van Dijk	... 	Kapitein Trappers

External links 
 

1942 films
Dutch black-and-white films
1940s children's adventure films
Dutch children's films
Films based on Dutch novels
Dutch adventure films
1940s Dutch-language films